J. Williams  was a producer, director and cinematographer of Malayalam language films. Primarily known as a cameraman, he has also directed 8 films  and has worked in Tamil, Telugu and Kannada language films as well.

Making his debut with the 1974 Kamal Haasan starrer Vishnu Vijayam, Williams was always known as an adventurous cinematographer and has worked over 50 films as a cameraman.

Personal life

He married actress Shanthi Williams in 1979. They had four children. he died at age 56 due to some serious cancers.

Filmography

Cinematography

 Vishnu Vijayam (1974)
 Njaan Ninne Premikkunnu (1975)
 Thulavarsham (1976)
 Anubhavam (1976)
 Sivathaandavam (1977)
 Sreedevi (1977)
 Vishukkani (1977)
 Rathimanmadhan (1977)
 Poojakkedukkaatha Pookkal (1977)
 Kaavilamma (1977)
 Adimakkachavadam (1978)
 Madanolsavam (1978)
 Madaalasa (1978)
 Thamburaatti (1978)
 Chuvanna Chirakukal (1979)
 Aval Niraparaadhi (1979)
 Devadaasi (1979)
 Mr Michael (1980)
 Benz Vasu (1980)
 Kaaliya Mardhanam (1982)
 Anuraagakkodathi (1982)
 Pooviriyum Pulari (1982)
 Ivan Oru Simham (1982)
 Bheeman (1982)
 Kodunkaattu (1983)
 Hello Madras Girl (1983)
 Jeevante Jeevan (1985)
 Ezhumuthal Onpathuvare (1985)
 Pathaamudayam (1985)
 Kannaaram Pothippothi (1985)
 Sunil Vayassu 20 (1986)
 Viswasichaalum Illenkilum (1986)
 Aattakkadha (1987)
 Agnimuhoortham (1987)
 Janmaantharam (1988)
 Douthyam (1989)
 Puthiya Karukkal (1989)
 Bhoomika (1991)
 Koodikkaazhcha (1991)
 Inspector Balram (1991)
 Uppukandam Brothers (1993)
 Butterflies (1993)
 Raajadhaani (1994)
 Sphadikam (1995)
 Neela Kuyil (1995) (Tamil film)
 Kalaapam (1998)
 James Bond (1999)
 The Gang (2000)
 Bamboo Boys (2002)

Direction
 Madaalasa (1978) 
 Mr. Michael (1980)
 Kaaliya Mardhanam (1982)
 Ponthooval (1983)
 Hello Madras Girl (1983)
 Jeevante Jeevan (1985)
 Aattakkadha (1987)
 Rishi (1992)
 Gentleman Security (1994)
 The Gang (2000)

Story
 Madaalasa (1978)
 Jeevante Jeevan (1985)
 Rishi (1992)

Screenplay
 Madaalasa (1978)
 Jeevante Jeevan (1985)

References

External links

Malayalam film cinematographers
Malayalam film directors
Film directors from Thiruvananthapuram
Film producers from Thiruvananthapuram
1948 births
2005 deaths
20th-century Indian film directors
20th-century Indian dramatists and playwrights
Screenwriters from Thiruvananthapuram
21st-century Indian film directors
20th-century Indian photographers
21st-century Indian photographers
Cinematographers from Kerala
20th-century Indian screenwriters